Ainsley Iggo FRS (2 August 1924 – 25 March 2012) was a New Zealand born neurophysiologist.

Life

He was born in Napier, New Zealand and studied at a farming college in Invercargill, where he won a bursary to study Agricultural Sciences at the University of New Zealand. There he was awarded a research scholarship to continue his studies in Britain. After gaining a BSc in electrophysiology and neuroscience at the University of Otago in Dunedin, he moved to Aberdeen to join the Rowett Research Institute, an agricultural research facility of the University of Aberdeen. There he was awarded a PhD for his studies on the vagus nerve of sheep.He moved to Edinburgh in 1954, where he began as a lecturer in physiology at the Medical School of the University of Edinburgh before accepting the Chair of Veterinary Physiology at the Royal (Dick) School of Veterinary Studies of the University of Edinburgh in 1962. He played the major role in establishing the school, commonly known as the Dick Vet, into an internationally recognised centre of excellence, before becoming dean of the School. He remained as professor emeritus of veterinary physiology until his death.

In 1958 he became the first scientist to demonstrate electrical recordings from individual C fibres, the thinnest of the body's nerves and also defined the function of the various sensory receptors in the skin which detect touch, tickle, heat and pain. One of the receptors is now named after him. Iggo received a DSc from the University of Edinburgh in 1963 for his thesis, “Mammalian afferent nerve fibres".

In 1973 he was a founder member and later president (1981–84) of the International Association for the Study of Pain (IASP). He was elected a Fellow of the Royal Society in 1978 and a Fellow of the Royal Society of Edinburgh.

In 1974 he succeeded Prof Frank Alexander as Dean of the Dick Vet. He was succeeded in turn in 1977 by Prof Ian Beattie. He was brought back for a second term as Dean from 1985 to 1990.

He died in Edinburgh on 25 March 2012. He is buried in Grange Cemetery in south Edinburgh. The grave lies midway along the north path on its north side.

Family

In 1952 he married New Zealand biochemist Betty Joan McCurdy (1926–2015), and together they had 3 sons.

References

External links

 Obituary in Scotsman
 Obituary in Edinburgh Evening News

1924 births
2012 deaths
People from Napier, New Zealand
New Zealand physiologists
New Zealand Fellows of the Royal Society
Fellows of the Royal Society of Edinburgh
University of New Zealand alumni
University of Otago alumni
Neurophysiologists
Academics of the University of Edinburgh